Salas, from Spanish salas (rooms, halls), is a Spanish surname and a common family name in the Hispanic-speaking world. It is ranked amongst the most common surnames found in Costa Rica and in Mexico.

People
 Ada Salas (born 1965), Spanish poet and author
 Agustín Salas del Valle (born 1964), Mexican serial killer
 Ailín Salas (born 1993), Argentine actress
 Alfonso Rodríguez Salas (1939–1994), Spanish footballer
 Alvaro Salas (born 1953), Uruguayan percussionist
 Benito Salas Vargas (1770–1816), military leader during Colombia's independence war
 Berta Vicente Salas (born 1944), Spanish photographer
 Carlos Salas (born 1955), Cuban volleyball player
 Carlos Salas Salas (first elected 1909), Chilean politician
 Claudia Hernández (tennis), full name Claudia Hernández Salas (born 1966), Mexican tennis player
 Dagoberto Campos Salas (born 1966), Costa Rican Roman Catholic Church archbishop and Apostolic Nuncio (diplomat)
 Dani Salas (born 1988), Spanish footballer
 Didac Salas (born 1993), Spanish pole vaulter
 Esther Salas (born 1968), United States District Judge
 Federico Salas (1950–2021), Peruvian politician
 Fernando de Valdés y Salas (1483–1568), Spanish churchman and professor
 Fernando Salas (baseball) (born 1985), Mexican baseball pitcher
 Franklin Salas (born 1981), Ecuadorian footballer
 Guillermo Salas (born 1974), Peruvian footballer
 Greg Salas (born 1988), American football wide receiver
 Henrique Salas Römer (born 1936), Venezuelan entrepreneur and politician
 Hilden Salas (born 1980), Peruvian footballer
 Ilse Salas (born 1981), Mexican actress
 Irma Salas Silva (1903–1987), Chilean educator
 José Mariano Salas (1797–1867), Mexican general and politician, twice interim president of Mexico
 Joseph Salas (1903–1987), American boxer
 Juan Salas (born 1978), Bominican MLB baseball pitcher
 Justin Salas (born 1982), American mixed martial artist
 Lauro Salas (1928–1987), Mexican world boxing champion
 Lizette Salas (born 1989), American golfer
 Marcelo Salas (born 1974), Chilean footballer
 Margarita Salas (1938–2019), Spanish scientist in the areas of biochemistry and molecular genetics
 Marina Salas (born 1988), Spanish actress
 Marino Salas (born 1981), MLB baseball pitcher
 Mario Salas Saieg (born 1967), former Chilean footballer
 Mark Salas (born 1961), American MLB baseball catcher
 Mary Salas (born 1948), American politician
 Nancy Salas (1910–1990), Australian musicologist
 Olimpia Salas Martínez (born 1958), Mexican professor and researcher in material sciences
 Óscar Salas (born 1993), Honduran footballer
 Óscar Salas Moya (1936–2017), Bolivian politician
 Patricia Salas O'Brien (born 1958), Peruvian sociologist and Minister of Education
 Paul Salas (born 1998), Filipino actor and model
 Pito Salas, Curaçaoan-American software developer
 Rafael M. Salas (1928–1987), first head of the United Nations Population Fund
 Renee Salas (started med school 2004), American physician and professor
 Rudy Salas (born 1977), American politician
 Rudy Salas (musician), American musician, founding member (1969) of El Chicano
 Stephanie Salas (born 1970), Mexican singer and actress
 Stevie Salas (born 1964), Native American guitarist and author
 Tito Salas (1887–1974), Venezuelan painter
 Víctor Salas (born 1980), Spanish footballer
 Vincent Salas (born 1989), Chilean footballer
 Walter Salas-Humara, American songwriter, founding member (1985) of The Silos
 Wilma Salas (born 1991), Cuban volleyball player

Fictional characters
 Paquita Salas, on the Spanish comedy web television series Paquita Salas
 Yelina Salas, on the CBS television series CSI: Miami
 Will Salas, in the 2011 science fiction film In Time
Roger Salas, in the American heist drama streaming television series  Kaleidoscope

See also
 Sala (disambiguation)
 Salaš (disambiguation)

Surnames of Spanish origin